Racławice  is a village in the administrative district of Gmina Kraszewice, within Ostrzeszów County, Greater Poland Voivodeship, in west-central Poland.

History
During the German occupation of Poland (World War II), ten Polish farmers from Racławice were murdered by the occupiers on February 11, 1940 in nearby Winiary (present-day district of Kalisz) at the site of large massacres of Poles from the region perpetrated in 1939–1940 as part of the Intelligenzaktion.

References

Villages in Ostrzeszów County